William Friend or Bill Friend may refer to:

William Benedict Friend (1931–2015), American Roman Catholic bishop in Louisiana
Bill Friend (engineer), American executive; Bechtel president in 1980s
Bill Friend (politician) (born 1949), American politician

See also
William Freind (c. 1710–1766), Dean of Canterbury
William Frend (disambiguation)